Grodziszcze  is a village in the administrative district of Gmina Świdnica, within Świdnica County, Lower Silesian Voivodeship, in south-western Poland.

The village has a population of 891.

History
In the 11th and 12th centuries, the village, initially known as Gramolin, was the seat of a castellany within medieval Poland, which was later moved to the nearby city of Świdnica.

During World War II, the Germans operated a forced labour camp for Jewish men in the village.

References

Villages in Świdnica County
Holocaust locations in Poland